Merrymount or Merry Mount may refer to:

Merrymount, a former British colony located in what is now Quincy, Massachusetts
Merrymount (Quincy, Massachusetts), a neighborhood in Quincy, site of the colony
Merry Mount (opera), an opera loosely based on story of the colony